Kalná nad Hronom is a village and municipality in the Levice District in the Nitra Region of Slovakia.

History
In historical records the village was first mentioned in 1209.

Geography
The village lies at an altitude of 162 metres and covers an area of 34.134 km².

Ethnicity
Kalná nad Hronom has a population of about 2,048 people. The village is approximately 77% Slovak, 17% Magyar and 6% Czech.

Government
The village has its own birth registry and police force.

Facilities
The village has a public library a gym and football pitch an.

Genealogical resources

The records for genealogical research are available at the state archive "Statny Archiv in Nitra, Slovakia"

 Roman Catholic church records (births/marriages/deaths): 1726-1896 (parish A)
 Reformated church records (births/marriages/deaths): 1790-1898 (parish A)

See also
 List of municipalities and towns in Slovakia

References

External links
Surnames of living people in Kalna nad Hronom

Villages and municipalities in Levice District